Te Pōhue is a small settlement in inland Hawke's Bay, in New Zealand's eastern North Island. It lies on State Highway 5, 31 kilometres inland from Whirinaki.

The remote settlement was once on a Māori track cutting across the tribal boundaries of Ngāti Kahungunu and Ngāti Tūwharetoa, two tribes who had made peace after a conflict. The modern settlement began as a hotel for travellers in the 1870s, when the original Napier to Taupo coach road was being cut through what was then a dense forest.

Two wind farms were approved for the area in 2006, despite some opposition from local residents.

Education

References

Hastings District
Populated places in the Hawke's Bay Region